In abstract algebra, a medial magma or medial groupoid is a magma or groupoid (that is, a set with a binary operation) which satisfies the identity

, or more simply 

for all x, y, u and v, using the convention that juxtaposition denotes the same operation but has higher precedence. This identity has been variously called medial, abelian, alternation, transposition, interchange, bi-commutative, bisymmetric, surcommutative, entropic etc.

Any commutative semigroup is a medial magma, and a medial magma has an identity element if and only if it is a commutative monoid. The "only if" direction is the Eckmann–Hilton argument. Another class of semigroups forming medial magmas are normal bands. Medial magmas need not be associative: for any nontrivial abelian group with operation  and integers ,  the new binary operation defined by  yields a medial magma which in general is neither associative nor commutative.

Using the categorical definition of product, for a magma , one may define the Cartesian square magma  with the operation
 .
Hence, a magma  is medial if and only if its binary operation is a magma homomorphism from  to . This can easily be expressed in terms of a commutative diagram, and thus leads to the notion of a medial magma object in a category with a Cartesian product. (See the discussion in auto magma object.)

is itself an endomorphism. It follows that the set End() of all endomorphisms of a medial magma  is itself a medial magma.

Bruck–Murdoch–Toyoda theorem 
The Bruck–Murdoch-Toyoda theorem provides the following characterization of medial quasigroups.
 
where  some fixed element of .  It is not hard to prove that  forms a medial quasigroup under this operation.  The Bruck–Toyoda theorem states that every medial quasigroup is of this form, i.e. is isomorphic to a quasigroup defined from an abelian group in this way. In particular, every medial quasigroup is isotopic to an abelian group.

The result was obtained independently in 1941 by D.C. Murdoch and K. Toyoda. It was then rediscovered by Bruck in 1944.

Generalizations 

The term medial or (more commonly) entropic is also used for a generalization to multiple operations.  An algebraic structure is an entropic algebra if every two operations satisfy a generalization of the medial identity.  Let f and g be operations of arity m and n, respectively.  Then f and g are required to satisfy

Nonassociative examples

A particularly natural example of a nonassociative medial magma is given by collinear points on Elliptic curves. The operation  for points on the curve, corresponding to drawing a line between x and y and defining  as the third intersection point of the line with the elliptic curve, is a (commutative) medial magma which is isotopic to the operation of elliptic curve addition. 

Unlike elliptic curve addition,  is independent of the choice of a neutral element on the curve, and further satisfies the identities . This property is commonly used in purely geometric proofs that elliptic curve addition is associative.

See also
 Category of medial magmas

References

 
 
 
 

Non-associative algebra